Matej Centrih (born 5 September 1988) is a football player from Slovenia who plays for Radomlje.

References

External links
PrvaLiga profile 

1988 births
Living people
Slovenian footballers
Association football fullbacks
NK Celje players
NK IB 1975 Ljubljana players
Slovenian PrvaLiga players